Likëngë are pork sausages flavored with salt, pepper and seed of fennel (farë mbrai). Characteristic of the ethnic Albanian Arbëreshë minority of Southern Italy, they are made in the Sicilian towns of Piana degli Albanesi and Santa Cristina Gela (today both part of the Metropolitan City of Palermo).  "Likëngë" is the indefinite singular, "Likënga" is the definite singular and is cognate with the Italian Lucanica and the Greek Loukaniko.

See also

 List of Sicilian dishes

References

External links 
 http://www.ciaoamerica.org/AlbaneseConnection.html

Cuisine of Sicily
Italian sausages
Albanian cuisine
Pork dishes